Phryxus is a monotypic moth genus in the family Sphingidae first described by Jacob Hübner in 1819. Its only species, Phryxus caicus, was described by Pieter Cramer in 1777.

Distribution 
It is found in the Neotropics, although it has been recorded from southern Florida and South Carolina.

Description 
The length of the forewings is 33–37 mm. South from Florida, adults are mainly found from August to November but may be found year round.

Biology 
In the tropics, larvae have been recorded on Apocynaceae species. In Florida, it has been recorded on Rhabdadenia bilfora.

References

Moths of North America
Moths of South America
Taxa named by Pieter Cramer
Moths described in 1777
Dilophonotini